Chick Corea Elektric Band was a jazz fusion band, led by keyboardist and pianist Chick Corea and founded in 1986 in New York City. The band was nominated twice at the Grammy Awards. The sixth band album, a tribute one named Chick Corea Elektric Band II - Paint the World and released in 1993, received an additional nomination the next year. The group reunited in 2003, and Corea died in 2021.

History

Original lineup and first two albums
The band was and its typical line-up, in addition to Corea, who played keyboards and piano, was Eric Marienthal (saxophone), Frank Gambale (guitar), John Patitucci (electric bass), and Dave Weckl (drums). This was the line-up for the first two albums: the eponymous The Chick Corea Elektric Band, released in 1986, and Light Years, released in 1987.

Third and fourth album
The third album was Eye of the Beholder, released in 1988. The material for the fourth album, Inside Out, released in 1990, was Corea originals. The last album featuring the band's traditional line-up was Beneath the Mask, released in 1991.

Fifth album and comeback of some historical members 
For the next album, Elektric Band II: Paint the World released in 1993, only Corea and Marienthal returned from the original line-up. Gary Novak became the new drummer, Jimmy Earl took the bass, and Mike Miller played guitar. The album's style is jazz-oriented.

The tribute album and return of other historical members
In 1996, the band recorded a version of "Rumble" from West Side Story for the tribute album The Songs of West Side Story; this saw Weckl and Gambale returning. The original members reunited in 2004 for To the Stars.

Last band tour and Corea's death
The band’s last tour took place in 2018.

Corea died of cancer at his home in the Tampa Bay area of Florida on February 9, 2021, at age 79; he had only recently been diagnosed.

Discography

Studio albums
The Chick Corea Elektric Band (1986)
Light Years (1987)
Eye of the Beholder (1988)
Inside Out (1990)
Beneath the Mask (1991)
  Elektric Band II: Paint the World (1993)
To the Stars (2004)

Live albums
Live from Elario's (The First Gig) (rec. 1985, rel. 1996)
Live in Tokyo 1987 (rec. 1987, rel 2017).

References 

American jazz ensembles
Jazz fusion ensembles
Musical groups established in 1986
Musical groups disestablished in 2017
Musical quintets